Yael Lempert (born 1973/1974) is an American diplomat who is the nominee to be the next US Ambassador to Jordan. She had served as Acting Assistant Secretary of State for Near Eastern Affairs between August 2021 and May 2022. She also served as Deputy Chief of Mission for the U.S. Embassy in London and U.S. Chargé d'Affaires to the United Kingdom. She is a career member of the Senior Foreign Service with the rank of Minister-Counselor.

Early life and education
Lempert graduated from the Walsh School of Foreign Service at Georgetown University. She is the daughter of ophthalmologist Philip Lempert and Lesley Lempert who serves on the board of the New York Civil Liberties Union.

Career
Lempert was Senior Director for the Levant, Israel, and Egypt at the National Security Council (NSC) from 2014 to 2017. She served as Special Assistant to the President from 2015 to 2017.

She was charged with "(heading) negotiations between the Netanyahu government and Obama administration over the military aid package, in addition to her work on the Israeli-Palestinian issue. The $38-billion deal, over 10 years, was the biggest the United States ever signed with any country."

Initially planning to return to the State Department after 20 years as a career diplomat, Lempert was asked to stay on for the transition and assembling of a new team in 2017 under Donald Trump. Trump officials thought that Lempert, with her "knowledge and experience", could help facilitate a deal between Israel and the Palestinians.

From June 1, 2017, until December 2018, Lempert served as acting Deputy Assistant Secretary for Egypt and North Africa.

Lempert served as Deputy Chief of Mission at the U.S. Embassy in London from January 2019 to 2021, and as Chargé d'Affaires, a.i. from January 2021 through July 2021. In 2020, she wrote to Andrea Leadsom, the MP for the family of Harry Dunn, to refuse their request for a meeting, as it "would not be appropriate" to meet with the family due to a potential lawsuit.

Lempert became the Acting Assistant Secretary of the State Department's Bureau of Near Eastern Affairs on August 31, 2021.

Ambassador to Jordan
On January 3, 2023, President Joe Biden nominated Lempert to be the ambassador to Jordan. Her nomination is pending before the Senate Foreign Relations Committee.

Personal life
Lempert married Italian diplomat Andrea Catalano di Melilli in 2008 at the Italian Embassy in Cairo. She speaks Arabic.

References

1970s births
Living people
American women ambassadors
Walsh School of Foreign Service alumni
Ambassadors of the United States to the United Kingdom
Obama administration personnel
Trump administration personnel
Biden administration personnel
21st-century American diplomats
21st-century American women
Place of birth missing (living people)